The 2023 Australian Open – Men's singles qualifying was a series of tennis matches that took place from 9 to 12 January 2023 to determine the sixteen qualifiers into the main draw of the men's singles tournament, and, if necessary, the lucky losers.

Seeds

Qualifiers

Lucky losers

Draw

First qualifier

Second qualifier

Third qualifier

Fourth qualifier

Fifth qualifier

Sixth qualifier

Seventh qualifier

Eighth qualifier

Ninth qualifier

Tenth qualifier

Eleventh qualifier

Twelfth qualifier

Thirteenth qualifier

Fourteenth qualifier

Fifteenth qualifier

Sixteenth qualifier

References

External links 
 Qualifying draw

Men's Singles Qualifying
2023